James Haggerty may refer to:

 James Haggerty (Canadian politician) (1833–1912), farmer
James Haggerty (New York politician) (1834–1887), Irish-American lawyer
 Jimmy Haggerty (died 1871), American gangster

See also
 James Hagerty (1909–1981), press secretary for Dwight D. Eisenhower
 James Haggarty (1914–1998), Canadian ice hockey player